A Pelada is a 2013 Belgium-Brazilian comedy film written and directed by Damien Chemin.

Plot
The film follows the story of a young couple, Caio and Sandra, who find it necessary to go through new experiences to revive the passion of the wedding, after their first serious crisis.

Cast
Kika Farias
Bruno Pêgo
Tuca Andrada
Karen Junqueira

Production
In November 2011, Chemin started to cast the actors, and principal photography took place in January and February 2012 in Aracaju. Post-production was done in Belgium, lasting until early 2013.

References

Bệnh viêm gan siêu vi b

2013 comedy films
2013 films
Belgian comedy films
Brazilian comedy films
Films shot in Sergipe
2010s Portuguese-language films